January 1 ( New Year's Day) is the first day of the year in the Gregorian calendar.

It can also refer to:

 January 1 (Eastern Orthodox liturgics) in Eastern Orthodox liturgics.
 January 1 (film), a 1984 Tamil-language film.
 "January 1st" (song), a 2019 song by the Japanese rock band Coldrain.

See also

 New Year's Day (disambiguation)

Date and time disambiguation pages